Jinshi is a town in Tongchuan District, Dazhou, Sichuan, China. , it has one residential community and 17 villages under its administration.

References

Township-level divisions of Sichuan
Dazhou